Dehaj Rural District is a rural district (dehestan) in Dehaj District, Shahr-e Babak County, Kerman Province, Iran. At the 2006 census, its population was 3,137, in 633 families. The rural district has 29 villages.

References 

Rural Districts of Kerman Province
Shahr-e Babak County